Belaka is a municipality located in Udayapur District of Province No. 1 of Nepal. It is one of four urban municipalities located in Udayapur District.  

The municipality was formed on 10 March 2017, when the Government of Nepal announced 744 local level units as per the new constitution of Nepal 2015. The municipality was formed merging following former VDCs: Tapeshwari, Rampur Thoksila, Mainamaini and Katunjebawala.

The municipality is divided into nine wards and the headquarter of the municipality is located at Rampur Bazar in ward no.9.

Geography
The municipality is situated in the easternmost part of Udayapur district. The geographical coordinations for the municipality is  -  Latitude and longitude. Shiwalik and Mahabharat Range border the municipality to the north and south part. The Sun Kosi River flows on the north border of the municipality; meets the Kosi River, which flows on the eastern border. The municipality includes the urban area of Rampur Thoksila and its neighborhood, rural areas, forests, foothills and grasslands.

It is surrounded by Bhojpur District to the north, Dhankuta to the north-east, Sunsari to the east, Saptari to the south and Chaudandigadhi of Udayapur to the west. The Koshi Tappu Wildlife Reserve is in the south-east corner.

Koshi Tappu Wildlife Reserve

Koshi Tappu Wildlife Reserve is a protected area located in Ward No. 2 of Belaka Municipality. It was established 1976 designed as Ramsar Site.

Bhootiya Daha
Bhootiya Daha is a small water fall and a natural pool which is famous in Udayapur District for water fun activities. The pool is located in Belaka Municipality, ward no. 5 at this coordinates: . Many people visit this place to enjoy their time with water.

Mainamaini
Mainamainiis a temple located in ward no.7 of this municipality. It is believed that long years ago this place was ruled by Kirant King & Queen who are collectively called as Mainamaini. 
Mainamaini is also famous for the statue of the pig which was built in July 2021 by Belaka municipality for Nrs.sixty Lakh(6000000)
Visit Udayapur feel the difference of scenic beauty.

Love Dada
It's a hill located in the Belaka-06 Buddha Chowk. it's well known in belaka for it's cinematic scenery of Rampur and also for the beautiful blowing air. 

VABARI DEVI TEMPLE

It is located in belaka,2. it is most scarded and wellknown temple in belaka. many people come to visit here to worship and look the view of Triyuga river.

References

External links
 www.mofald.gov.np/
 www.belakamun.gov.np
 www.kathmandupost.ekantipur.com

 
Populated places in Udayapur District
Municipalities in Koshi Province
Municipalities in Udayapur District